The Association of Private and People's Museums of Russia (before August 2021 — the Association of Private Museums of Russia) is a non-profit organization founded in 2018 that unites private museums of Russia and museum specialists on a voluntary basis. The Association represents the interests of the museum community before the executive authorities and offers a permanent platform for private museums for open dialogue and sharing experience.;

Alexey Shaburov, Director of the Contemporary Museum of Calligraphy, Russia, Director of the Russian Gusli and Chinese Guqin Museum, President of the Sokolniki Museum and Educational Center, has been the head of the Association since the beginning.

The mission of the Association is to popularize Russian folk culture, preserve the cultural code and cultural heritage, promote museum pedagogy and cultural tourism. The Association strives to ensure that museums remain a vital part of society.

History 
The cross-regional Association of Private Museums of Russia was officially registered in 2018.

In 2020, at the regular Congress of the museum community, the Charter of the Association was adopted and signed by 19 museums. The association includes more than 500 museums from 85 regions of Russia. Both legal entities and individuals can be members of the association.

Activity 
The Association protects the collective interests and rights of its members. Main lines of action:

 creating of an information cluster that systematizes the information about cultural goods stored in private museums;
 improving the legal and regulatory framework for museum activities;
 organizing and holding professional exhibitions and conferences
 developing tourist infrastructures in the regions
 adding new museums to the museum routes.

As a result of the exhibition "Private Museums of Russia. Talents of Russia" held in Moscow in 2019 with the support of the Ministry of Culture of the Russian Federation, the first catalog of Private Museums of Russia was published in three languages (Russian, English, Chinese). More than 500 museums are classified into several groups by subject: ethnographic, military history, general history, fine art, everyday life history, applied art, folk art, political history, and natural science museums. The catalog is updated annually.

In 2020, after the museum lockdown, the Ministry of Culture of the Russian Federation, the Union of Museums of Russia, and the Association of Private Museums of Russia designed the 2021-2023 Development Program for Private Museums. The final document is advisory both for the Ministry of Culture and for local government. The association is represented in the Expert Council for the Selection of Museum Items, headed by the Deputy Minister of Culture Alla Manilova. The Association provides legal support for private museums registration as non-profit organizations and further integration into the federation museum space.

In 2021, The Ministry of Culture, together with the Russian Union of Travel Industry and Tour Operators' Association of Russia, launched a new project "Museum Routes of Russia", in which the Association of Private Museums of Russia is directly involved. The association team travels to the regions of Russia to discover museums, estimate their tourist attractiveness, and add them to the catalog. With the help of volunteers, the Association makes small films about museum collections, which are publicly available on its YouTube channel, the magazine Private Museums of Russia is issued quarterly, demonstrating the diversity of the cultural landscape of Russia.

References 

Museums in Russia
2018 establishments in Russia